Donald P. Olsen (December 3, 1910 - 1983) was an American violinist, educator and painter. He played the violin for the Utah Symphony in the 1930s, he taught art and music at Jordan High School in Sandy, Utah, and he became an abstract expressionist painter in the 1950s. His work was exhibited posthumously at the Utah Museum of Fine Arts in 2011.

Further reading

References

1910 births
1983 deaths
Musicians from Provo, Utah
Musicians from Salt Lake City
Artists from Salt Lake City
Painters from Utah
Abstract expressionist artists
American male painters
American male violinists
20th-century American painters
20th-century American violinists
20th-century American male musicians
20th-century American male artists